Lozier was a brass era producer of automobiles in the United States.

Lozier may also refer to 
Lozier, Iowa, a ghost town
Lozier House and Van Riper Mill

People with the last name Lozier
Charlotte Denman Lozier (1844–1870), an American physician
Jean-Baptiste Charles Bouvet de Lozier (1705–1786), a French sailor, explorer, and governor of the Mascarene Islands
Jennie de la Montagnie Lozier (1841 – 1915), an American physician
John C. Lozier, an American control engineer
Ralph F. Lozier (1866–1945), a U.S. Representative from Missouri
Susan Lozier, a physical oceanographer

French-language surnames